The Spy is an English-language French espionage streaming television miniseries, created and directed by Gideon Raff, based on the life of Israel's top Mossad spy Eli Cohen, who is portrayed by Sacha Baron Cohen. The series is a production by French company Légende Entreprises for Canal+ and Netflix. OCS is airing the show in France and Netflix is streaming the show internationally outside France. The six-episode miniseries, released on September 6, 2019, on Netflix, was inspired by real-life events. It is based on the book L'espion qui venait d'Israël (English: The Spy Who Came from Israel), written by Uri Dan and Yeshayahu Ben Porat.

The series has received "generally favorable reviews" according to Metacritic, with Baron Cohen's performance being praised. However, the series has been criticized for lapses in historical accuracy. There is no independent verification about whom Cohen met with in the Syrian elite while working undercover in Buenos Aires or Damascus. At the 77th Golden Globe Awards, Baron Cohen received a nomination for Best Actor – Miniseries or Television Film.

The series was mainly filmed in Casablanca.

Plot 

The miniseries follows the exploits of Eli Cohen, a Mossad spy. The story takes place during the years leading to the 1967 Six-Day War between Israel and Syria. It follows Cohen's past in Egypt as an army reject, to his infiltration of the Syrian Ministry of Defense. He assumes the identity of Kamel Amin Thaabet and establishes himself in Syrian high society. After having befriended people who would eventually take over Syria, Cohen is appointed as the country's Deputy Defense Minister and becomes a close confidant to the future president Amin al-Hafiz.

Cast
 Sacha Baron Cohen as Eli Cohen / Kamel Amin Thaabet
 Hadar Ratzon-Rotem as Nadia Cohen, Eli's wife
 Yael Eitan as Maya
 Noah Emmerich as Dan Peleg
 Nassim Si Ahmed as Ma'azi Zaher al-Din
 Moni Moshonov as Jacob Shimoni
 Alona Tal as Julia Schneider 
 Mourad Zaoui as Benny 
 Alexander Siddig as Ahmed Suidani
 Marc Maurille as IDF sergeant 
 Waleed Zuaiter as General Amin al-Hafiz 
 Arié Elmaleh as Michel Aflaq
 Hassam Ghancy as Colonel Salim Hatum
 Uri Gavriel as sheikh Majid al-Ard
 Tim Seyfi as Mohammed bin Laden

Episodes

Production
The show was filmed in Morocco, Hungary, and the UK. Filming was said to not be possible in Syria due to the Syrian Civil War.

Reception
On Rotten Tomatoes, the series holds an 86% approval rating based on 43 reviews, with an average rating of 6.97/10. The site's critics consensus reads, "Though at times stodgy, The Spy exploration of a real-life spy remains engaging thanks to a moving performance from Sacha Baron Cohen." On Metacritic, it has a weighted average score of 68 out of 100 based on 16 critic reviews, indicating "generally favorable reviews".

Nick Allen of rogerebert.com gave the series 3 out of 4 stars, largely praising the excitement the series builds and that it adds a new dimension to the spy genre. Allen writes, "...by the end of episode one, “The Spy” takes off as Eli transforms into Kamel while delivering a monologue to the camera—Kamel's life story—and the series casts a spell, showing a chameleonic actor playing a chameleonic character."

Sacha Baron Cohen's performance has been well received.  Rolling Stones Alan Sepinwall writes, "But Baron Cohen couldn’t have found a role more well suited to his gifts and career to date. The Spy is a thriller played entirely straight, but it also feels like Baron Cohen’s persona with vastly higher stakes."

Analysts have noted questions of historical accuracy of some of the events presented, as is the case with most historical dramas.  According to former Syrian President Amin al-Hafiz, he never met Cohen in Argentina, much less befriended him, and the office of "Deputy Defense Minister" did not even exist in Syria at the time. The position of Chief Advisor to the defense minister did exist – a position in which Cohen claimed to have served.

References

External links

2019 French television series debuts
2019 French television series endings
French crime drama television series
Espionage television series
Historical television series
Canal+ original programming
English-language Netflix original programming
Television series based on books
Television series created by Gideon Raff
Television shows set in Buenos Aires
Television shows set in Israel
Television shows set in Syria
Television shows set in Switzerland
True crime television series
Works about the Mossad